Kirchberg am Wechsel is a town in the district of Neunkirchen in the Austrian state of Lower Austria. It is notable for hosting the International Wittgenstein Symposium since 1976 and is the home of the Austrian Ludwig Wittgenstein Society.

Population

References

Cities and towns in Neunkirchen District, Austria